Alingpo (a55 le21 pho21; ; also called Yiqing 彝青 or Dry Yi 干彝) is a Loloish language of eastern Yunnan, China.

Classification
Li, et al. (2011) classify Alingpo as an Eastern Yi language similar to Nasu and Gepo. However, Hsiu (2018) notes that it is a Southeastern Loloish language closely related to Lope, Axi, Azhe, and Azha.

Distribution
Alingpo is spoken by tens of thousands of people in Shizong County and Luoping County. In Shilin County, Alingpo is spoken in only one village, Yimeidu village 矣美堵村,  by about 100 people. In Shilin County, Alingpo speakers are surrounded by Sani speakers.

References

Loloish languages
Languages of Yunnan